The Patriotic Martyrs' Cemetery is a national cemetery in North Korea located in Sinmi-ri, Hyongjesan-guyok, Pyongyang. Founded on September 17, 1986, it is officially reserved for people who contributed to the "liberation of the country" and "socialist construction". Buried here are many veterans of the Korean independence movement, army and national officials, and outstanding citizens in the fields of science, medicine, and literature.

Burials
Among those interred here are:

A
 An Woo Saeng (안우생/; 1907–1991), poet and activist.

C
 Cho Ki-chon (조기천/; 1913–1951), poet
 Cho So-ang (조소앙/; 1887–1958), independence activist
 Cho Wan-gu (조완구/; 1881–1952), independence activist
 Choe Deok-sin (최덕신/; 1914–1989), politician
Choe Pong Man, contributed to development of Workers' Party of Korea while in the Central Committee of the Workers' Party of Korea.
 Choi Hong Hi (최홍희/; 1918–2002), general and deportist
 Choe Tong-oh (최동오; 1889–1963), independence activist
 Choi Seung-hee (최승희/; 1911–1969), dancer

H
 Hyon Chol-hae (현철해/; 1934 – 2022), military officer
 Han Sorya (한설야/; 1900–1976), writer
 Hong Myong-hui (홍명희/; 1888–1968), writer
 Hong Si Hak, councillor in mining industry

J 
 Jon Hui-jong (전희정/全熙正; 1930–2020), former vice-minister of Foreign Affairs
Jon Ku Gang (1947? – 2021), the first female general of the Korean People's Army.
 Jong Myong Hak, dedicated life to strengthening Workers' Party of Korea

K
 Kim Chang-sop (김창섭/金昌燮; 1946–2020), general
 Kim Yong Chun (김영춘/; 1936–2018), politician and general
 Kang Yang Wook (강량욱/; 1903–1983), Presbyterian minister and politician
 Kang Chang-Soo (강창수/姜昌秀) a.k.a Hideo Nakamura (1913–2013), Korean-born Karateka
 Kang Jang-ho, director of KPA art studio
Kang Song-san, worked to develop the country.
 Kim Kyu-sik (김규식/; 1881–1950), independence activist
 Kim Ok-song (1916–1965/66), composer
Kim Pyong Hwa, contributed to development of orchestra in North Korea.
 Kye Ung-sang (계응상/; 1893–1967), geneticist

M
 Mu Chong (무정/; 1904–1951), general

O
 Om Hang-sop (엄항섭/; 1898–1962), independence activist
O Mi-ran (오미란; 1954-2006), famous actress

P
 Pak In Yong, former general of the Korean People's Army.
Paek Nam-sun (백남순/; 1929–2007), Minister of Foreign Affairs
 Paek Nam-un (백남운/; 1894–1979), economist
 Park Yun-gwan, dedicated life to strengthening Workers' Party of Korea
 Pak Se-yong (박세영/; 1902–1989), writer of the lyrics to Aegukka
 Pyon Ung Hui, architectural engineer

R
 Ra Myong Hui, Hero of the DPRK
 Ri Hyon-sang (리현상/; 1905–1953), independence activist, politician
 Ri Jae-il (리재일/李在一; 1935–2021), politician
 Ri Ki-yong (리기영/; 1895–1984), novelist
 Ri Kuk-ro (리극로/; 1893–1982), independence activist
 Ri Myon-sang (이면상/; 1908–1989), composer/conductor
 Ri Sung-gi (리승기/; 1958–1996), chemist
 Ryu Dong-ryol (류동열/; 1879–1950), independence activist
 Ryu Mi-yong (류미영/; 1921–2016), politician

S 
 Sin Un-ho, officer of KPA
 Son Chang Gu, hospital section chief

U
 U Chi-son (우치선/于致善; 1919–2003), ceramic artist

Y
 Yon Hyong-muk (연형묵/; 1931–2005), politician
 Yun Ki-sop (윤기섭/; 1887–1959), independence activist

See also
 Kumsusan Palace of the Sun
 Revolutionary Martyrs' Cemetery
 Cemetery for North Korean and Chinese Soldiers
 Daejeon National Cemetery
 Seoul National Cemetery

References

External links
 North Korean Human Geography (in Korean)

Pyongyang
Cemeteries in North Korea
1986 establishments in North Korea